Elizabeth railway station is located on the Gawler line.

History 

Elizabeth station opened in 1960.

It was first rebuilt in 1999 with one island platform that was accessible by an underground pedestrian subway, and included a 40–50 metre roof. In March 2012, the station was rebuilt in a $15 million project. The work involved demolition of the island platform, construction of two side platforms, the track was re-aligned, and other changes were made in preparation for the electrification of the Gawler Central line, which was completed in June 2022. As some peak-hour services were to terminate at Elizabeth, the rebuild included the addition of a siding just north of the station to allow trains to stable clear of the main line. The western platform is accessed both by a level crossing and an overpass; the level crossing is used for emergencies only.

Services by platform

Transport links 

|}

|}

|}

Gallery

References

External links 
 
 Flick gallery

Railway stations in Adelaide
Railway stations in Australia opened in 1960